The International Swaminarayan Satsang Mandal (ISSM) is a religious organisation of the Hindu faith based in USA. It comes under the Laxmi Narayan Dev Gadi of the Shree Swaminarayan Sampraday. The organisation has temples and centres in various parts of the country as well as a temple in Chicago, Illinois (America).

"International Swaminarayan Satsang Mandal" is a federally registered trade mark of ISSO of Chicago, Inc. in the USA. Currently, ISSM has been Associated with SS-AUSM, SS-AUSM still remains with Shri Swaminarayan Mandir, Chicago (Wheeling). LNDYM Youth wing has been established under SS-AUSM in order to spread the Swaminarayan Sampraday.

Temples

ISSM originally had six temples under it, all of them being named Vadtal Dham after Vadtal in India, where the headquarters of the parent organisation is located. The temple in Grand Prairie is an exception, being named Gadhpur Dham after the Swaminarayan temple in Gadhada.

 Grand Prairie: Opened on 4 July 1991, when the image of Swaminarayan in the form of Ghanshyam was installed by present Acharya Shree Ajendraprasad Pande of the Vadtal Gadi.
 Chicago (Wheeling): This temple was dedicated in 1991. It has the titles Vadtal Dham, Vadtal of USA, ISSM, and ISSO Of Chicago The central deity in this temple is Swaminarayan in the form of Ghanshyam by present acharya Ajendraprasadji Maharaj.
 New Jersey: Dedicated on 11 July 2004. The central deities at this temple are Lakshmi Narayan and Rancchodrai along with Swaminarayan in the form of Hari Krishna. They were installed by acharya rakeshprasad.
Scranton: Dedicated in 2014, murtis were installed by P.P. 108 Bhavi Acharya Shree Nrigendraprasadji Maharaj. 
Richmond: Also dedicated in 2014 and murtis were installed by Nrigendraprasadji Maharaj. 
Houston, Texas: Also dubbed Vadtal Dham, this Mandir is being built in Houston under the command of Ajendraprasadji Maharaj
Monmouth Junction: Pratistha date is being planned in summer of 2017 under the guidance of Ajendraprasadji. This mandir has Saturday Satsang at 5:00 pm. 
Downey: This temple was dedicated in 2000. The temple has images of Lakshmi Narayan and Swaminarayan in the form of Ghanshyam also by Ajendraprasadji  
Racine, WI: Shree Swaminarayan Hindu Temple Racine has been opened for Darshan. Official Murti Pran Pratishtha is still under planning, but very near.
London: LNDYM London has been holding weekly Satsang sabhas and are currently seeking a permanent place of worship. Visit swaminarayan.cc for more information. 
Australia: LNDYM Australia holds bi-weekly Satsang Sabhas in Various cities. Visit Satsang.com.au for more information. 
Congo: P.P. Lalji Shree Nrigendraprasadji Maharaj performed Pratishtha in February 2014 and holds daily Satsang sabhas. This is also the headquarters of LNDYM Africa. 
Seychelles: LNDYM Seychelles currently is allied with NNDYM Seychelles to continue spreading Satsang on the island. 
Dubai: LNDYM Dubai currently holds Satsang sabhas at satsangis' homes. Please visit the LNDYM Dubai Facebook page for more information.

Since the authoring of this article, Downey, New Jersey (Vadtaldhamusa), and Dallas have removed themselves from ISSM and now participate an independent to-be-named organization

Notes

References 
 
 

Swaminarayan Sampradaya
Hindu organizations based in the United States
International Hindu organizations